The  Internazionali di Modena  was a tennis tournament held in Modena, Italy. Held once, in 2005, this WTA Tour event was played on outdoor claycourts.

Past finals

Singles

Doubles

See also
Internazionali di Tennis Emilia Romagna
List of tennis tournaments

References

Defunct tennis tournaments in Italy
Clay court tennis tournaments
WTA Tour
Modena